Day6 videography is a videograph works compilation of Day6, a rock band from JYP Entertainment. They have 24 music videos, 21 of them are Korean songs and the rest are Japanese songs. Moreover, Day6 has the first own variety show called DAY6 Real Trip <DAYOFF> in Jeju.

Music videos

Variety shows

References 

Videographies of South Korean artists